Dean Erickson (born December 5, 1958, Maine) is an actor and the founder and CEO of Bionic Capital LLC, a registered investment advisory firm which specializes in wealth management and philanthropic investment solutions.

After graduating from Brown University, he worked on Wall Street as an options trader and risk arbitrageur.

After six years he became an actor, guest starring in five episodes of Frasier, starring as Gabriel Knight in the award-winning video game The Beast Within, and starring in several lesser Shakespearean productions. He later turned his focus to writing. He has published a mystery novel, No One Laughs at a Dead Clown, under the name DC Erickson, and a self-help book, Choose Your Story, Choose Your Life.

In 2010, he was elected to the Midcoast Maine Sports Hall of Fame.

References

External links
Official Website

Dean Erickson profile

1958 births
American male stage actors
American male television actors
American male video game actors
American male voice actors
Living people
Brown University alumni